Sutherland's Drug Store is a small family-owned drug store in Yellowknife, Northwest Territories, Canada. The company was established in Fort McMurray, Alberta by Angus Sutherland in 1918 and expanded into the Yellowknife gold fields during the rush in 1938. Its first store was located in Old Town Yellowknife and was managed by Walter Hill and Keith Miller. The store closed during the war but reopened and expanded following the post-war gold boom. In 1948, the Old Town store was physically moved to the new downtown development and a second store was built in Old Town. Two stores were run by the chain into the 1950s. In 1951, Doug and Wilma Finlayson and A.L. Blackberg bought the Sutherland chain following the death of Angus Sutherland. In 1954, the Old Town store closed; in 1956, the current downtown store was built and the original store brought up from Old Town years previous was rented to commercial tenants. Sutherland's Drug Store continues to operate today in its expanded storefront and successfully competes with larger department stores in Yellowknife.

The second Old Town store built in 1947 still exists today and was used for various commercial purposes after 1954 including: the Rex Cafe, the Yellowknifer newspaper office, the Woodstove Shop, and is now used as residential apartments on School Draw Avenue.

References

Buildings and structures in Yellowknife